One male athlete from Sri Lanka competed at the 1996 Summer Paralympics in Atlanta, United States.

See also
Sri Lanka at the Paralympics
Sri Lanka at the 1996 Summer Olympics

References 

Nations at the 1996 Summer Paralympics
1996
Summer Paralympics